Muhammad Yunus Jaunpuri (2 October 1937 – 11 July 2017) was an Indian Islamic hadith scholar who served as the senior professor of hadith at the Mazahir Uloom in Saharanpur. He was one of the senior students and disciples of Muhammad Zakariyya Kandhlawi. He taught at the Mazahir Uloom and authored books such as Al-Yawaqit al-Ghaliyah, Kitab at-Tawhid and Nawadir al-Hadith.

Biography
Muhammad Yunus Jaunpuri was born on 2 October 1937 in Jaunpur. He graduated from the Mazahir Uloom in 1961. He studied with Muhammad Zakariyya Kandhlawi and was seen among his senior disciples.

Yunus taught different books of Hadith at Jamia Mazahir Uloom Jadeed. He was appointed Shaykh al-Hadith of the Jamia in 1388 AH. At the Mazahir Jadeed, he taught Sahih Al-Bukhari for over 50 years. 

Yunus died on 11 July 2017. His funeral was attended by over one million people and the prayer was led by Talha Kandhlawi, the son of Muhammad Zakariyya Kandhlawi. International Islamic scholar Ismail ibn Musa Menk expressed grief over his demise. Indian poet and scholar Fuzail Ahmad Nasiri also expressed grief and said that Jaunpuri was an exemplar scholar of hadith.

Literary works
Jaunpuri's books include:
 Al-Yawaqit al-Ghaliyah
Kitab at-Tawhid
Nawadir al-Hadith
Nibrās al-Sārī ilā Riyāḍ al-Bukhārī
Nawadir al-Fiqh

References

Indian Muslim scholars of Islam
Deobandis
1937 births
2017 deaths
People from Jaunpur district
Mazahir Uloom alumni
Mazahir Uloom faculty